FC Slovan Galanta is a Slovak football team, based in the town of Galanta. The club was founded in 1911.

Beginnings of football in Galanta

In 1911, GSG Galántai Sport Club was found in the city. The current club has no continuity with this club, but they are keeping the traditions of the first club in the town.

Current squad 
As of 1 september 2018

 Players with "*" next to their name can also feature in the lineup of ŠKF Sereď thanks to an agreement between these two clubs.

Out on loan

Technical staff

References

External links 
Official Website 

Football clubs in Slovakia
1911 establishments in Austria-Hungary